Stephen, Steve, or Steven Collins may also refer to:

 Stephen Collins (politician) (1847–1925), British MP for Kennington
 Steve Collins (baseball) (born 1918), minor league player and manager
 Stephen Collins (born 1947), American actor and writer
 Steven Collins (archaeologist) (born 1950), American
 Steven Collins (Buddhist studies scholar) (1951–2018), English
 Steve Collins (footballer) (born 1962), English
 Steve Collins (ski jumper) (born 1964), Canadian
 Steve Collins (born 1964), Irish boxer
 Stephen Collins (speedway rider) (born 1966), English motorcyclist
 Steve Collins (American football) (born 1970), Oklahoma Sooners quarterback
 Steve Collins (engineer), spacecraft engineer
 Stephen Collins (journalist), Irish journalist
 Steven Collins, computer science lecturer
 Stephen Collins, a character in the BBC series State of Play

See also
 Stephen Dando-Collins (born 1950), Australian historian and novelist
 Collins (surname)
 Justin Collins, rugby league footballer of the 1990s and 2000s, also known as Steve Collins